OVO Sound (also known simply as OVO) is a Canadian independent record label, founded in 2012 by hip hop artist Drake, producer 40, and Oliver El-Khatib. Between 2012 to 2022, it operated as a subsidiary of Warner Records.

The label represents acts including Drake, PartyNextDoor, Majid Jordan, Roy Woods, Dvsn, Plaza, Baka Not Nice, Popcaan, Smiley, and Naomi Sharon. In-house producers include 40, Boi-1da, DJ Prince OVO Nineteen85, Mike Zombie and T-Minus.

History

The label's roots can be traced back to 2006, when Drake's first official mixtape, Room for Improvement, was released under the unofficial record label "All Things Fresh" which eventually became "October's Very Own". Drake later raised the profile of the label by prominently featuring OVO throughout his music, regularly mentioning the label in songs and on stage, as well as promoting OVO merchandise.

The record label was officially founded in 2012 by Drake and long-time collaborators Noah "40" Shebib and Oliver El-Khatib following the success of Drake's third studio album Nothing Was the Same. According to Billboard, Drake signed a five year partnership deal with Warner Records, which was extended in 2017.

Drake was signed as a solo artist to Republic Records through Young Money and Cash Money for nine years.  Drake's 2018 release Scorpion was his last project under Young Money/Cash Money. On the other hand, the artists Drake signs to OVO Sound through Warner have their content distributed through the latter.

Upon founding the label in 2012, Drake and 40 signed frequent collaborators Boi-1da, T-Minus, Mike Zombie to the label as in-house producers (the latter two are the only active signees in the label to come outside of Canada). In April 2013, it was reported that Drake was close to signing the label's first recording artist, PartyNextDoor, which he ended up revealing shortly thereafter. In August 2013, Drake announced that he signed Toronto music duo Majid Jordan to OVO Sound. OB O'Brien and iLoveMakonnen would soon sign in 2014, with the latter being the first non-Canadian act and second non-Canadian signee after to Mike Zombie. Makonnen would eventually leave OVO Sound in April 2016, wishing to pursue his interests as a solo artist with Warner. Canadian rap artist Roy Woods and R&B duo Dvsn, composed of singer Daniel Daley and producer Nineteen85, soon joined the label in 2015 and 2016, with each act releasing an EP and studio album respectively. In 2021, Canadian rapper Smiley was signed to the label.

On January 20, 2023, OVO announced the signing of Dutch-Caribbean singer, Naomi Sharon, becoming the first female artist on the label.

Roster

Current acts

Former acts

In-house producers

OVO Sound Radio
OVO Sound Radio was a radio program that aired on Beats 1, fortnightly on Saturdays. The show primarily aired newer material, with at least one song premiering in each broadcast. The show's initial airing was on July 11, 2015, and it was hosted by Drake and Oliver El-Khatib. The show is notable for debuting hit Drake singles, such as platinum-selling "Hotline Bling", and chart-topping "One Dance". The show ended on October 27, 2018.

Sound 42
On March 4, 2021, Drake announced that he and Oliver would debut their new 24 hour radio station, "Sound 42" on Sirius XM featuring the return of OVO Sound Radio that same night. In an interview with GQ, Drake spoke on the partnership saying "It's something that Scott [Greenstein] from SiriusXM was extremely passionate about from the inception of our partnership. He's been so supportive with us as far as Sound 42 goes. And Sirius offers us the opportunity to be heard far and wide, right? Sirius is just the closest thing we have to those days of glory radio moments and I still get a massive amount of joy premiering music when I know that everyone is listening at the same time."

OVO Clothing
OVO Clothing was launched in 2011. The series of clothing began with a series of collaborations between Roots Canada and OVO, which produced several parkas, jackets and other collaborations. In 2013, merchandise for the OVO figurehead included collaborations with the Toronto Raptors, which coincided with Drake becoming the franchise's Global Ambassador. OVO has since morphed into a clothing line in itself, releasing a slew of clothes during every season of the year. T-shirts, sweatshirts, varsity jackets, baseball hats, and knit beanies are seasonal installations. OVO Clothing oversaw the opening of the first OVO store for the brand's clothing in downtown Toronto, opening on December 6, 2014. Exactly a year after the opening in Toronto, OVO stores expanded to the United States, opening a flagship store in Los Angeles, California. Its New York store opened in December 2016 on Bond Street, and its Chicago store in August 2019 on Walton Street in Gold Coast. OVO also opened its first location in Vancouver in December 2018.
Other OVO collaborations have included Canada Goose, and Air Jordan.

Its pre-2016 collection was composed of basketball shorts, OVO jerseys, track jackets, and baggy hoodies.

On November 9, 2020, it was revealed via the OVO Clothing Instagram account that NHL Hall of Famer Wayne Gretzky would be a model for the Fall and Winter 2020 collection. Gretzky and OVO Clothing founder Drake are both proud natives of southern Ontario, Canada. Also featured in the collection was former Canadian Olympian Ross Rebagliati, who won a gold medal in Giant Slalom Snowboarding in the 1998 Nagano Olympics.

Discography

Studio albums

Compilation albums

Soundtrack albums

Mixtapes

EPs

Notes

References

External links

 

OVO Sound
Drake (musician)
Companies based in Toronto
Record labels established in 2012
Vanity record labels
Warner Records
Canadian hip hop record labels